Cynthia Elbaum (March 19, 1966 – December 22, 1994) was an American photojournalist, killed in Chechnya, where she was working as a freelancer for Time, the BBC, Moscow Times, reporting on the First Chechen War.

Biography
Cynthia Elbaum, who was of Russian descent and grew up in Ashfield, Massachusetts, graduated from Smith College in 1989 with a major in Russian studies. She traveled frequently to the former Soviet Union, working as a freelance photojournalist. Elbaum studied Russian at the University of Moscow after graduating from Smith and also worked as a freelance photographer in Russia before returning to the States where she worked as a translator for a Time photographer and taught English to Russian refugees. Elbaum began her career as a photojournalist in 1992, after she witnessed dead bodies on a Moscow street following Boris Yeltsin's takeover of the Russian parliament.

On assignment for Time magazine during the start of the first war in Chechnya, Cynthia was photographing in the streets of Grozny, the capital of the breakaway republic, when she was killed in a Russian bombing raid. She is the first journalist known to have been killed in that war. At least 23 other civilians were killed in the shelling.

Dedications
Elbaum's papers are held at Smith College.

Cynthia Elbaum name was written on the glass panels of the Freedom Forum Journalists Memorial at the Newseum in Washington, D.C.

References

External links 
 "Cynthia Elbaum: A Life In Pictures, 2012 Ashfield Film Fest Grand Prize Winner" https://www.youtube.com/watch?v=TRAjDwBmhFU
 "CD for Cynthia: Musician remembers photojournalist friend, Smith grad, killed while covering Chechen-Russian War" http://www.gazettenet.com/Archives/2015/01/Cynthia-hg-020515
 Cynthia Ellen Elbaum papers at the Sophia Smith Collection, Smith College Special Collections

1966 births
1994 deaths
American photojournalists
Journalists killed while covering the Chechen wars
War photographers
Women in the Chechen wars
Women war correspondents
American women journalists
20th-century American women writers
People from Ashfield, Massachusetts
20th-century American non-fiction writers
20th-century American women photographers
20th-century American photographers
Women photojournalists